Edenvale or Eden Vale may refer to:
 Edenvale, Gauteng, South Africa
 Edenvale, County Antrim, a townland in County Antrim, Northern Ireland; se List of townlands of County Antrim
Edenvale (San Jose), a neighborhood of San Jose, California
 Edenvale, Ontario, a village in Ontario, Canada
Edenvale, Queensland, a neighbourhood in Kingaroy, Australia
 Eden Vale, a hamlet Castle Eden parish, County Durham, England

See also 

 Eden Valley (disambiguation)